A ram was a weapon fitted to varied types of ships, dating back to antiquity. The weapon comprised an underwater prolongation of the bow of the ship to form an armoured beak, usually between 2 and 4 meters (6–12 ft) in length. This would be driven into the hull of an enemy ship to puncture, sink or disable it.

Ancient rams

It was possibly developed in late Bronze age Egypt, but it only became widely used in later Iron age Mediterranean galleys.
The ram was a naval weapon in the Greek/Roman antiquity and was used in such naval battles as Salamis and Actium. Naval warfare in the Mediterranean rarely used sails, and the use of rams specifically required oarsmen rather than sails in order to maneuver with accuracy and speed, and particularly to reverse the movement of a ramming ship to disentangle it from its sinking victim, lest it be pulled down when its victim sank. The Athenians were especially known for their diekplous and periplous tactics that disabled enemy ships with speed and ramming techniques.

Rams were first recorded in use at the battle of Alalia in 535 BC. There is evidence available to suggest that it existed much earlier, probably even before the 8th century BC. They appear first on stylized images found on Greek pottery and jewelry and on Assyrian reliefs and paintings. The ram most likely evolved from cutwaters, structures designed to support the keel-stem joint and allow for greater speed and dynamism in the water.

Many other historical vessels were used as rams, such as the Korean Turtle ship.

The Athlit ram

The Athlit ram, found in 1980 off the coast of Israel near Atlit, is an example of an ancient ram. Carbon 14 dating of timber remnants date it to between 530 BC and 270 BC.

Rams were thought to be one of the main weapons of war galleys after c. 700 BC, and the Athlit ram's construction implies advanced technology that was developed over a long period of time. Heavy timbers were shaped and attached to the hull, and then the bronze ram was created to fit around the timbers for added strength. The evidence for this lies in the remnants of timbers found inside the Athlit ram when it was discovered. The blunt edge of the ram and the patterned protrusion were intended to break open the seams of the target ship while at the same time dispersing the force of impact on the attacking ship to prevent the ram from twisting off and damaging the attacking ship. It was also less likely to become stuck in the hull of its target.

The Athlit ram consists of a single bronze casting weighing . The bronze that makes up the shell is a high-quality alloy containing 9.78% tin with traces of lead and other elements. The shell was cast as a single piece to match the timbers it protected. The casting of an object as large as the Athlit ram was a complicated operation at the time, and would have been a considerable expense in the construction of a war galley.

The most likely casting method would have been the lost wax technique, which was commonly used for statues and other large casting during this period. Flaws toward the rear of the casting indicate that it was cast "head down" so the best quality of metal was at the very front of the ram. Voids, bubbles, and insufficient filling in the initial casting were repaired using both "plugs" that were hammered into holes, and "casting on" where a new clay mould was built around the flaws and additional molten metal poured in.

The ram can be divided into roughly three sections – the driving centre, the bottom plate, and the cowl. This is the area of the ram that makes contact with enemy vessels in battle. The surface of the ram was decorated with several symbols. On both sides, there is an eagle head, a thunderbolt, and a helmet surmounted by an eight-point star. The eagle symbols are similar in dimension, but contain many inconsistencies with each other, whereas the helmet and thunderbolt are highly identical, suggesting they were duplicates made from a primary mold before being made part of the final wax master. The ram was attached with mortise and tenon joints and strengthened with  oak pegs. The wales and the ramming timber are designed to interlock for extra strength.

Decline
A key element in the design and construction of a ramming vessel is the ability to stop its forward progress and reverse course, the better to allow the rammed ship to sink without her crew boarding the ramming vessel.  As navies became more dependent on sailing ships, which do neither well, rams were generally discarded, particularly as gunpowder increased the range at which ships could effectively attack one another.  Only a few instances of non-accidental ramming are recorded from the Age of Sail.

Steam rams

With the development of steam propulsion, the speed, power and maneuverability it allowed again enabled the use of the ship's hull, which could be clad in iron, as an offensive weapon. As early as 1840, the French admiral Nicolas Hippolyte Labrousse proposed building a ram steamship, and by 1860, Dupuy de Lôme had designed an ironclad with a ram. The first coastal battleship, France's Taureau, was built in 1863, for the purpose of attacking warships at anchor or in narrow straits, and was armed with a ram. Many ironclad ships were designed specifically to ram opponents; in ships of this type, the armour belt was extended forward to brace both sides of the ram to increase structural integrity.

The theory behind the revival of the weapon derived from the fact that, in the period around 1860, armour held superiority over the ship-mounted cannon. It was believed that an armoured warship could not be seriously damaged by the naval artillery in existence at the time, even at close range. To achieve a decisive result in a naval engagement, therefore, alternative methods of action were believed to be necessary. As it followed, from the same belief, that a ship armed with a ram could not be seriously damaged by the gunfire of its intended victim, the ram became, for a brief period, the main armament of many battleships.  It was observed that the guns placed on the Taureau were there "with the sole function of preparing the way for the ram."

During the American Civil War, both Union and Confederate forces employed ram ships.  In 1862, Charles Ellet, Jr. was deployed directly by the Secretary of War, Edwin M. Stanton, to build the United States Ram Fleet, a fleet of ram ships to counter the Confederate River Defense Fleet controlling the Mississippi River.  Ellet purchased nine steam powered paddle boats and retrofit them for service as ram ships.  The ram ships played an important part in the Union victory during the First Battle of Memphis and helped the Union forces wrest control of the Mississippi River from the Confederate forces.

The frequent use of ramming as a tactic in the Battle of Lissa and, to a lesser extent, at the Battle of Iquique also led to many late 19th-century naval designers equipping their warships with ram bows. This only really aggravated a number of incidents of ships being sunk by their squadron-mates in accidental collisions as ramming never featured as a viable battle tactic again. The fixation on ramming may also have inhibited the development of gunnery.
 
Toward the end of the 19th century, the breech-loading cannon could effectively hit enemy ships at several thousand yards range, and the ineffectiveness in battle of the ram became clear;  ships were no longer fitted with them. Battleships and cruisers instead had inverted bows which superficially resembled rams. These were not, however, reinforced, and were fitted in order to improve ship speed by increasing the waterline length. They also served to decrease the length of forecastle that was exposed to muzzle flash when the guns were fired directly ahead.

No other ironclad was ever sunk by wartime ramming by an enemy ship, although the ram was regarded by all major navies for some 30 years as primary battleship armament. A number of ships were, however, rammed in peacetime by ships of their own navy. A total of 358 seamen lost their lives in the incident. However, that death toll was dwarfed by the 562 deaths (plus two rescuers) ensuing from the sinking of the passenger liner , which accidentally collided with the ram bow of the anchored  in 1891.

Twentieth century

During both world wars, there were several occasions when surfaced submarines were rammed and sunk by surface ships. The only battleship-over-submarine victory in history occurred during World War I, when the battleship  rammed and sank U-boat U-29. Submarines were strongly built to resist water pressure at depth, so the ramming ship could be badly damaged by the attack. She was sunk by another U-boat the next day as she sat helpless, without working engines.

The U-boat was not critically damaged and there followed a small-arms battle between the vessels as they were locked together and the U-boat was too close for Borie to bring her main guns to bear. The submarine eventually sank but Borie was too badly damaged by the ramming to be salvaged, so she was abandoned and deliberately sunk by Allied forces.

The  herself rammed and sank Soviet submarine ShCh-305 on 5 November 1942.

As ramming was the only weapon available to unarmed merchant ships, there were occasions when they attempted to ram U-boats. The British Admiralty in the First World War expected that some merchant captains might try to ram U-boats as much as twice the size of their own vessel and capable of much greater speed, if the situation favoured such a tactic. In 1915,  attempted, but failed, to ram . Her captain, Charles Fryatt, was captured by the Germans a year later. He was court-martialled and executed as they considered his act to be that of a franc-tireur. The French steamer Molière sank the U-boat  in 1917. An old British paddle steamer, SS Mona's Queen, rammed and sank a U-boat in February 1917. In May 1918 SM UC-78 was sunk by the steamer Queen Alexandra, and  rammed and sank .

During World War II,  was struck by the British tanker SS Ensis. The submarine survived the ramming but had to return to port for repair.  The Italian merchant ship Antonietta Costa rammed and sank submarine HMS Rainbow while on a convoy from Bari to Durazzo. Accidental ramming can also occur during wartime, such as in October 1942 when, during escort duty, the light cruiser  was accidentally sliced in half and sunk by the significantly heavier (15x) ocean liner , with the loss of 337 men.

On August 2, 1943, IJN Destroyer Amagiri rammed and sank a smaller, faster, and more maneuverable, USN PT boat commanded by LtJG John F. Kennedy.

Explosive motor boats which usually detonated after ramming their target were employed by the Italian and the Japanese navies in WWII. Italian type MTM boats rammed and crippled the cruiser HMS York and a Norwegian tanker at Suda Bay in 1941, while Shinyo suicide boats sank a number of US amphibious craft in the Pacific Theatre of operations in 1945.

Late in the century, ramming by major warships became the tactic of choice during the Cod Wars conflict between the Icelandic Coast Guard and the Royal Navy. At least 15 British frigates, five Icelandic patrol boats and one British supply ship were damaged by ramming between 1975 and 1976.

Towing tests of warships found that a below-water ram reduced resistance through the water, which led to the development of a non-reinforced bulbous bow where rams were formerly fitted.

Torpedo ram

The torpedo ram is a hybrid torpedo boat combining a ram with torpedo tubes. Incorporating design elements from the cruiser and the monitor, it was intended to provide a small and inexpensive weapon systems for coastal defence and other littoral combat.

Like monitors, torpedo rams operated with very little freeboard, sometimes with only inches of hull rising above the water, exposing only their funnels and turrets to direct enemy fire. They were equipped with torpedoes and guns in turrets.  Early designs incorporated a spar torpedo that could be extended from the bow and detonated by ramming a target.  Later designs used tube-launched self-propelled torpedoes, but retained the concept of ramming, resulting in designs like , which had five torpedo tubes, two each port and starboard and one mounted in the centre of her reinforced ram bow.

Civilian use

Rams have also been used on civilian vessels.  The Seattle fireboat Duwamish, built in 1909, was designed to ram burning wooden vessels, as a last resort.

In fiction
In H. G. Wells' novel The War of the Worlds, the 'ironclad ram' HMS Thunder Child destroys at least two Martian fighting machines before it is sunk.

Several entries in the Assassin's Creed series of games allow the player to equip rams onto their ships.

Experimental Archaeology 
From 2021 to 2023, a team of nautical archaeologists from Texas A&M University successfully cast an ancient trireme sized naval ram based on ancient methods. The project consisted of three major steps to replicate the construction process: false bow construction, beeswax model creation, and lost-wax casting. The purpose of the experimental reconstruction was to better understand the time, manpower, and materials needed to create naval rams which helped to understand the economic, social, and political apparatuses of ancient navies. The reconstructed naval ram, called the "DeCasien ram" after its builder Stephen DeCasien, is currently housed at the main lab in The Center for Maritime Archaeology and Conservation (CMAC) at Texas A&M University.

See also
Inverted bow

 Ramming at sea warfare
Rostral column, commemorative columns adorned with rams
Rostra, speaker's platforms adorned with rams
Dolphin (weapon)

References

Ram
Naval warfare of antiquity